IBX is an abbreviation for 2-Iodoxybenzoic acid, a reagent in organic chemistry.

IBX may also refer to:
 Independence Blue Cross, a Philadelphia-based health insurance company
 IBX (North Carolina), an abbreviation for North Carolina's Inner Banks
 IBX Group AB, a Swedish company
 Interborough Express (IBX), a proposed expansion of New York City Subway